Shankar Chakraborty is an Indian film and television actor who has done several tele serials and has appeared in pivotal roles in numerous Bengali films.

Personal life
Shankar Chakraborty was born to a Bengali Hindu family. He married actress Sonali Chakraborty in 1990. His wife Sonali breathed her last on 31 October, 2022 following prolonged liver complications. He took to the social media to declare her sudden demise.

Filmography 

 Chitra (unreleased)
 Bhroon (Unreleased)
 Karnel (Unreleased)
 Jaanbaaz (2019) as Rahim Bhai
Mon Jaane Na (2019) 
 Maati (2018) as Meghla's father
 Total Dadagiri (2018) as Bibhutibhusan Das
Jio Pagla (2017) 
 Love Express (2016) as Ram Prasad Ganguly
 Ki Kore Toke Bolbo (2016) as Akash's father
 Arshinagar (2015) as Biswanath Mitra
 Bela Seshe (2015) as Barin
 Naxal (2015) as Arijit Mitra
 Game (2014) as Dibakar Panda
 Buno Haansh (2014) as Badal Bhai
 Final Mission (2013) as Binod Pandey
 Dutta Vs Dutta (2012) as Ghenti Kaku
 Teen Kanya (2012)
 Darling (2012)
 Ullas (2012) as Mr. Kambli
 Astra (2012) as Shambhu Da
 Palatak (2012)
 Bhorer Pakhi (2011)
 Gosainbaganer Bhoot (2011) as Godai Daroga
 Keloda in Kashmir (2011)
 Ek Poloke Ektu Dekha (2011)
 Janala (2009)
 Satyameba Jayate (2008)
 Khela (2008)
 Janmadata (2008) as Shibnath
 Mahaguru (2007) as Munna
 Greptar (2007) as Arjun Ghosh
 Kalishankar (2007) as Beni Madhav
 Hungama (2006)
 Ghatak (2006) as Bablu Koley
 Dosar (2006) as Mita Ray's Husband
 Dadar Adesh (2005) as Munna
 Chore Chore Mastuto Bhai (2005) as Nagraj's henchman
 Mayer Anchal (2003) as Jaga
 Moner Majhe Tumi (2003) as Haabu
 Uttara (2000) as Balaram
 Asukh (1999)
 Jiban Sandhan (1997)
 Bhoy (1996) as Samir
 Sansar Sangram (1995)
 Mejo Bou (1995)
 Charachar (1994)
 Tobu Mone Rekho (1994)

Television

References

External links 
 

Living people
Male actors in Bengali cinema
Bengali male television actors
Place of birth missing (living people)
Indian Hindus
Bengali Hindus
1962 births